Artesanos is a 2011 Spanish documentary film. It was selected by African Film Festival of Cordoba - FCAT.

Synopsis 
The craftsmen in the Marrakesh medina speak of the loss of values and the disappearance of the traditional way of life, while tourists stroll by unaware of their reality. Products "made in China" and the ever-increasing presence of plastic products does not allow them to earn enough to live off their crafts.

External links 
 

2011 films
2011 short documentary films
Spanish short documentary films
Marrakesh
Documentary films about globalization
Films shot in Morocco
2010s Spanish films